Creagrocercidae is a family of nematodes belonging to the order Spirurida.

Genera:
 Creagrocercus Baylis, 1943

References

Nematodes